Albert Ellis (1913–2007) was an American psychologist.

Albert Ellis may also refer to:

 Albert Ellis (prospector) (1869–1951), New Zealand prospector and administrator
 Albert J. Ellis Airport, a public airport near Jacksonville, North Carolina, US
 Albert Ellis (footballer) (1889–1961), English footballer
 Albert Gallatin Ellis (1800–1885), politician, newspaper publisher and editor in Wisconsin, US
 Albert H. Ellis (1861–1950), politician and farmer from Oklahoma

Ellis, Albert